Mladen Vranković (2 July 1937 – 11 February 2021) was a Croatian football player and manager.

Career
Born in Rtina, he played for his hometown club, HNK Rijeka, for eight seasons, collecting 350 caps. He also spent three years in the North American Soccer League playing for Kansas City Spurs. Following the end of his career he became a manager. He was Rijeka's manager between 1987 and 1989, leading the club to the 1986–87 Yugoslav Cup final against Hajduk Split. He briefly coached Australian club Sydney Croatia in the now defunct Australian National Soccer League during the 1991–92 season.

Managerial statistics

 *Dates of first and last games under Vranković; not dates of official appointments

Honours
Kansas City Spurs
NASL: 1969
Western Conference: 1968, 1969

References

1937 births
2021 deaths
Footballers from Rijeka
People from Zadar County
Association football defenders
Yugoslav footballers
HNK Rijeka players
Kansas City Spurs players
Yugoslav First League players
North American Soccer League (1968–1984) players
Yugoslav expatriate footballers
Expatriate soccer players in the United States
Yugoslav expatriate sportspeople in the United States
Yugoslav football managers
HNK Rijeka managers
HNK Šibenik managers
Croatian football managers
Sydney United 58 FC managers
HNK Orijent managers
NK Zadar managers
Croatian expatriate football managers
Expatriate soccer managers in Australia
Croatian expatriate sportspeople in Australia